This is a list of electoral results for the electoral district of Boroondara in Victorian state elections.

Members for Boroondara

A new district, Eastern Suburbs, was created in 1889 covering much of the same area as Boroondara.

Boroondara was re-created in 1904.

Election results

Elections in the 1940s

Elections in the 1930s

|- style="background-color:#E9E9E9"
! colspan="6" style="text-align:left;" |After distribution of preferences

 Preferences were not fully distributed.

Elections in the 1920s

Elections in the 1910s

References

Victoria (Australia) state electoral results by district